The Antarctic Medal is a civil decoration of Norway. Established by King Olav V on 3 February 1960, it was awarded to the individuals associated with the Sixth Norwegian Antarctic Expedition. The medal ranks 27th in the order of precedence of Norwegian honours. The medal ranks below the Maudheim medal, but above H. M. The King's Commemorative Medal in Gold. The medal was awarded to 37 individuals who were part of or associated with Sixth Norwegian Antarctic Expedition.

Recipients
The following are the 37 recipients of the medal:

References

Orders, decorations, and medals of Norway
Exploration of Antarctica
Awards for polar exploration
Awards established in 1960
1960 establishments in Norway